The Play-offs of the 2012 Fed Cup Europe/Africa Zone Group II were the final stages of the Group II Zonal Competition involving teams from Europe and Africa. Using the positions determined in their pools, the seven teams faced off to determine their placing in the 2012 Fed Cup Europe/Africa Zone Group II. The top two teams advanced to Group I, and the bottom two teams were relegated down to the Group III for the next year.

Promotion play-offs
The first-placed teams of each pool played against the second-placed teams of the other pool in head-to-head rounds. The winner of each round advanced to the 2013 Europe/Africa Zone Group I.

South Africa vs. Turkey

Georgia vs. Montenegro

Relegation play-offs
The third-placed teams of each pool played against the fourth-placed teams of the other pool in head-to-head rounds. The loser of each round was relegated to the 2013 Europe/Africa Zone Group III.

Finland vs. Norway

Latvia vs. Denmark

Final Placements

See also
Fed Cup structure

References

External links
 Fed Cup website

2012 Fed Cup Europe/Africa Zone